Braulio Alonso High School is a public high school located in Tampa, Florida, United States. It serves grades 9-12 for the Hillsborough County Public Schools.

Alonso High is named after Braulio Alonso. He served on the board of directors in the National Education Association from 1958 to 1964, and was elected as its president in 1967, the first Hispanic to hold that office.

Alonso High School's mascot is the Raven. Alonso is an IB World School.

Athletics 
Alonso High School currently offers the following sports:

Baseball (Varsity, JV)
FHSAA's 2008-09 6A State Baseball Champions; 2010-2011 6A State Baseball Champions 2009-2010
Football (Varsity, JV)
Soccer (boys' and girls')
Basketball (Varsity and JV, boys' and girls')
Wrestling (Varsity and JV)
Tennis (boys' and girls')
Swimming (boys' and girls')
Golf (boys' and girls')
Volleyball (Varsity and JV)
Softball (girls' Varsity)
Cross country (boys' and girls')
Girls' flag football (Varsity and JV)
 District Champions - 2010, 2011, 2012, 2013, 2014, 2018
 Regional Champions - 2010, 2011, 2014, 2018
 State Runner-Up - 2010, 2011
 State 2A Champions 2018
Track (boys' and girls')

Notable alumni
Anthony Chickillo, NFL linebacker for the Denver Broncos
Leger Douzable, NFL defensive tackle
Alex Faedo, first round pick in the 2017 MLB Draft by the Detroit Tigers
Jose Fernandez, former pitcher for the Miami Marlins

References

External links
 Alonso High School

High schools in Tampa, Florida
Public high schools in Florida
2001 establishments in Florida
Educational institutions established in 2001